Burgoyne is a surname.

Burgoyne may also refer to:

Burgoyne campaign, alternate name of the 1777 Saratoga campaign
19543 Burgoyne, or 1999 JR30, a Main Belt asteroid
Burgoyne, Ontario, a community of the municipality of Arran-Elderslie, Ontario, Canada
Burgoyne Bay, a bay at the southern end of Saltspring Island in British Columbia, Canada, named after Hugh Talbot Burgoyne
Fort Burgoyne, a fort northeast of Dover, England, United Kingdom
Ulmus americana 'Burgoyne', a cultivar of Ulmus Americana
Burgoyne baronets, from two British baronetcies

See also

Burgoyne Bay Provincial Park, a provincial park in British Columbia, Canada

Bourgogne (disambiguation)
Burgundy (disambiguation)